Mia and the White Lion is a 2018 family adventure film directed by Gilles de Maistre. The film stars Daniah de Villiers, Mélanie Laurent, and Langley Kirkwood. The film was released in France on December 26, 2018 and in the United States on April 12, 2019.

Synopsis
Ten year old Mia Owen has her life turned upside down when her family decides to leave London to manage a lion farm in Africa. When a beautiful white lion, Charlie, is born, Mia finds happiness once again and develops a special bond with the growing cub.

When Charlie grows too old to be kept in the house, Mia's father, John, decides to place the growing lion into an enclosure away from all human contact. When Mia's brother, Mick, is injured by Charlie, Mia's parents forbid her from interacting with Charlie - if she does, they will sell him for money. However, Mia defies her father's instructions not to interact with Charlie. In retaliation, her father opts to sell Charlie - Mia is shocked to discover that the farm she lives on is selling lions to be shot by trophy hunters to make money. She becomes determined to save Charlie from this cruel practice so drives across South Africa with him intending to release him into the Timbavati Game Reserve - a refugee for the iconic white lions.

However, a trophy hunter named Dirk who does business with John has his heart set on making Charlie his next trophy and sets out across the country to get him. Mia's family also go after them with the intention of stopping the government from having Mia imprisoned for harboring a dangerous predator.

Mia and Charlie arrive at the Timbavati Game Reserve, where Dirk and his companion ambush them. Charlie manages to attack Dirk and escape with Mia. Mia's family and the police spot Charlie and Mia entering the Game Reserve - the police attempt to shoot Charlie but cannot do so once he is safely in the reserve. Sometime later, Mia and her family revisit the Timbavati Game Reserve and are delighted to see that Charlie has mated with a lioness and has a litter of cubs.

Cast
 Daniah De Villiers as Mia Owen
 Mélanie Laurent as Alice Owen
 Langley Kirkwood as John Owen
 Ryan Mac Lennan as Mick Owen
 Lionel Newton as Kevin
 Lillian Dube as Jodie
 Brandon Auret as Dirk
 Thor as Charlie the lion

Production
Directed by French director Gilles de Maistre, the expansive production was filmed over the course of three years so that the film's young stars Daniah De Villiers and Ryan Mac Lennon could bond and develop real relationships with the lions and other animals that appear in the film. The scenes between the actors and the animals in the film are real and not reliant on CGI. Mélanie Laurent, Langley Kirkwood, Brandon Auret and Lillian Dube also star.

Kevin Richardson, a lion expert also known as the "Lion Whisperer", oversaw the entire production process and all interactions between the lions and the children ensuring the safety of the animals, cast and crew on set.

The film is based on an original story written by de Maistre's wife, Prune de Maistre, after they visited lion-breeding farms in South Africa. The screenplay is written by Prune de Maistre and William Davies. The film is co-produced by Studiocanal, M6 Films, Film Afrika and Pandora film and created in collaboration with Canal+, Cine+, M6, W9 and Film-und Medienstiftung NRW in partnership with Kevin Richardson.

Reception

Box office 
Mia and the White Lion is currently the highest-grossing French production outside France in 2019, accumulating a total of 2.43 million spectators (€13 million in box office revenues) in 25 markets around the world, including 900,000 admissions in Italy (€5.62 million) and 264,000 admissions in Colombia (€625,000).

Critical response
Reviews were broadly positive. On Metacritic, the film has a weighted average score of 52 out of 100, based on 6 critics, indicating "mixed or average reviews".

References

External links

English-language French films
English-language German films
English-language South African films
2010s French-language films
Films shot in South Africa
Films about animal rights
Films about animal cruelty
Films produced by Jacques Perrin
French drama films
French coming-of-age films
German coming-of-age films
German drama films
South African drama films
StudioCanal films
2010s French films
2010s German films